Yarden Cohen is an Israeli footballer who plays Maccabi Petah Tikva.

Career
Cohen started his career Maccabi Haifa's youth teams. At the age of 18 he joined the youth team of Hapoel Ra'anana. On 2 August 2016, Cohen made his senior 
debut in a 0–0 draw against Hapoel Tel Aviv in the Toto Cup.

On 9 March 2019, Cohen scored his debutgoal in the 2–2 draw against Hapoel Haifa.

On 3 August 2020, Cohen was loaned to Maccabi Petah Tikva.

Career statistics

References

External links
 

1997 births
Living people
Israeli footballers
Hapoel Ra'anana A.F.C. players
Maccabi Petah Tikva F.C. players
Israeli Premier League players
Footballers from Tirat Carmel
Association football defenders